Ramla Bay ("red sands") is a bay with a beach of reddish-coloured sand in Gozo, in the Maltese Islands. It lies on the north-east coast of the island, between the bays of Marsalforn and San Blas. The closest village is Xagħra.

Planning permission 

On June 6, 2007, the Malta Environment and Planning Authority (MEPA) approved the construction of 23 villas next to Calypso Cave, despite the objection of the Superintendent of Cultural Heritage, the Labour Party, the Alternattiva Demokratika and Malta's main environmental organisations . MEPA did not request an environment impact assessment for the development, leading to a call for their resignation. The case was expected to be reported to European Union environment commissioner Stavros Dimas. Claims that archeologists had found no objection for the development were rebutted by the same consultants, who were told that the report was to help assess the promotion of a heritage trail, rather than a mega-building project .

Beaches of Malta
Gozo
Bays of Malta
Xagħra